Bernard Middleditch (1870 – 3 October 1949) was an English international footballer, who played as a right half.

Career
Born in Highgate, Middleditch played for Corinthian, and earned one cap for England in 1897.

References

External links

1870 births
1949 deaths
English footballers
England international footballers
Corinthian F.C. players
Footballers from Highgate
Association football wing halves